Bramley Vale is a village in Derbyshire, England, south of Bolsover. It is in the civil parish of Ault Hucknall.

History
Bramley Vale is a former colliery village and has a lengthy mining heritage, from the opening of the Glapwell colliery in 1882 till it closed in 1974 with all the men being transferred to other local collieries.

Geography
The village is four miles south of Bolsover, close to junction 29 of the M1 motorway, and has good transport links to Chesterfield, Mansfield, and Nottingham provided by the TM Travel service number 73 and Pronto bus. The A617 road runs through the village.

Amenities
It has one local shop which has a free ATM.

Companies
Companies based in Bramley Vale include:-
 Eve Trakway who specialise in temporary access systems and related services from trackway systems, barriers, fencing and traffic management to security with headquarters in Bramley Vale; the company was a former division of J. L. Eve Construction.
 Coverworld, producers and suppliers of single and twin skin coated steel cladding systems.

References

External links
Pronto Bus Timetables

Villages in Derbyshire
Bolsover District